The 1978 West Virginia Mountaineers football team represented West Virginia University in the 1978 NCAA Division I-A football season. It was the Mountaineers' 86th overall season and they competed as an NCAA Division I-A independent. The team was led by head coach Frank Cignetti Sr., in his third year, and played their home games at Mountaineer Field in Morgantown, West Virginia. They finished the season with a record 2–9.

Schedule

Roster

References

West Virginia
West Virginia Mountaineers football seasons
West Virginia Mountaineers football